England has a comprehensive league structure in place, including national fully professional leagues to amateur regional leagues.

The format and competitiveness of the leagues have changed greatly since their beginnings in 1987. Likewise the leagues started off amateur but professionalism has since been permitted. However, it has always had three or four national leagues with various regional and county leagues below.

Sunday Telegraph Merit Tables
The Sunday Telegraph published Merit Tables for the leading English clubs from the 1960s to the 1980s. The position of the clubs was based on the percentage of matches won with only matches against other clubs in the table counting.

Sunday Telegraph English Champions 1964 to 1987:

1963-64 London Scottish
1964-65 London Scottish
1965-66 Bristol
1966-67 London Welsh
1967-68 London Welsh
1968-69 London Welsh
1969-70 Coventry
1970-71 London Welsh
1971-72 Bristol
1972-73 Coventry
1973-74 Bristol
1974-75 Rosslyn Park
1975-76 Northampton
1976-77 Moseley
1977-78 London Welsh
1978-79 London Welsh
1979-80 Leicester
1980-81 Leicester
1981-82 Gloucester
1982-83 Coventry
1983-84 Wasps
1984-85 Bath
1985-86 Leicester
1986-87 Bath

Precursor competitions
While there were experiments with county leagues in the north in the nineteenth century for most of rugby union's history there have been no organised leagues. The 1970s saw the creation of a national cup and a series of regional and county merit leagues (the most important of which being the North, Midlands, South West and London merit league).

In 1984 this was taken one step further with the creation of two national merit leagues for the top twenty four clubs (based around playing a minimum of sixteen fixtures against each other, a factor which led to Exeter's exclusion after consideration). The top division had three clubs from each of the major merit leagues. In these clubs had to play a minimum of eight fixtures against the other clubs in their division but it was largely based around pre-existing fixtures. There was a system of promotion and relegation between the Merit Tables. 1985 saw the addition of a third national merit table, albeit without promotion and relegation to the top two.

1984–85 season
The initial lineups of the merit tables was as follows:

Merit Table A

Bath
Bristol
Coventry
Gloucester
Gosforth
Harlequins
Leicester
London Irish
London Scottish
Moseley
Orrell
Sale

Merit Table B

Bedford
Blackheath
Headingley
Liverpool
London Welsh
Northampton
Nottingham
Richmond
Rosslyn Park
Saracens
Wasps
Waterloo

Merit Table A
Champions: Sale
Relegated: Coventry; London Irish; Orrell
Merit Table B
Promoted: Headingley; Nottingham; Wasps

1985–86
This year saw the creation of Merit Table C with the following clubs:

Birmingham
Exeter
Fylde
Metropolitan Police
Morley
Nuneaton
Plymouth
Roundhay
Sheffield
Vale of Lune
Wakefield
West Hartlepool

Merit Table A
Champions:Gloucester
Relegated: Gosforth; Headingley
Merit Table B
Promoted: 1st Orrell; 2nd Coventry;
Liverpool merge with non-league St Helens to become Liverpool-St Helens
Merit Table C
Champions (not promoted):

1986–87

Merit Table A
Champions: Bath
Relegated to National 2: London Scottish
Merit Table B
Promoted into National 1: Waterloo
Merit Table C
Champions (not promoted):
Relegated to Area League North: Roundhay
Admitted to National 3: Maidstone

Foundation of the national league system
In 1987 the merit tables formed the basis of the top three divisions of the national league system. For the first season there were no fixed fixtures so clubs had to arrange their own (to a minimum of ten out of eleven opponents, only one game against each club could count). For the initial season there was no promotion and relegation between National 2 and National 3 but this was created for the following season. National 3 had a minimum of two clubs per region (with the top four clubs in the previous season's Merit Table C getting a guaranteed spot outside this quota) thus Roundhay missed out on a spot to Maidstone.

In 1988 clubs had their fixtures set by the league for them though still only played each other once.

Initial composition of major leagues
National 1

Bath
Bristol
Coventry
Gloucester
Harlequins
Leicester
Moseley
Nottingham
Orrell
Sale
Wasps
Waterloo

National 2

Bedford
Blackheath
Gosforth
Headingley
Liverpool-St Helens
London Irish
London Scottish
London Welsh
Northampton
Richmond
Rosslyn Park
Saracens

National 3

Birmingham
Exeter
Fylde
Maidstone
Metropolitan Police
Morley
Nuneaton
Plymouth
Sheffield
Vale of Lune
Wakefield
West Hartlepool

Area League North

Birkenhead Park
Broughton Park
Derby
Durham City
Lichfield
Northern
Preston Grasshoppers
Roundhay
Rugby
Solihull
Stourbridge

Area League South

Askeans
Camborne
Cheltenham
Havant
Lydney
Salisbury
Sidcup
Southend
Streatham-Croydon
Stroud
Sudbury

1987–88 season

National 1

Champions: Leicester
Relegated: Coventry; Sale
National 2
Promoted: Liverpool-St Helens; Rosslyn Park
National 3
Champions (not promoted): Wakefield
Relegated: Birmingham; Morley (both to Area League North)

Area League North
Promoted: Rugby
Relegated: Birkenhead Park; Derby; Solihull
Promoted into league: Stoke; Winnington Park
Area League South
Promoted: Askeans
Relegated: Streatham-Croydon
Promoted into league: Ealing; Redruth

1988–89 season

National 1

Champions: Bath
Relegated: Liverpool-St Helens; Waterloo
National 2
Promoted: Bedford; Saracens
Relegated: London Scottish; London Welsh
National 3
Promoted: Rugby; Plymouth
Relegated: Maidstone; Metropolitan Police (both to Area League South)

Area League North
Promoted: Roundhay
Relegated: Birmingham
Promoted into league: Kendal; Walsall
Area League South
Promoted: Lydney
Relegated: Ealing; Sidcup; Stroud
Promoted into league: Basingstoke; Clifton

1989–90 season

National 1

Champions: Wasps
Relegated: Bedford
National 2
Promoted: Liverpool-St Helens; Northampton
National 3
Promoted: London Scottish; Wakefield
Relegated to National 4 South: London Welsh

Area League North
Promoted: Broughton Park; Morley
Promoted into league: Birmingham-Solihull; Harrogate; Hereford; Otley
Area League South
Promoted: Clifton; Metropolitan Police
Relegated: Salisbury
Promoted into league: Ealing; Maidenhead; North Walsham; Weston-super-Mare

1990–91 season

For the 1990–91 season all divisions were increased to 13 teams and the Area Leagues were renamed National 4 North and National 4 South.

National 1

Champions: Bath
Relegated: Liverpool-St Helens; Moseley
National 2
Promoted: London Irish; Rugby
Relegated: Headingley; Richmond
National 3
Promoted: Morley; West Hartlepool
Relegated: Metropolitan Police (to 4 South); Vale of Lune (to 4 North)

National 4 North
Promoted: Otley
Relegated: Birmingham-Solihull; Stoke
Promoted into league: Aspatria; Towcestrians
National 4 South
Promoted: Redruth
Relegated: Cheltenham; Maidenhead
Promoted into league: High Wycombe; Sidcup

1991–92 season

National 1

Champions: Bath
Relegated: Nottingham; Rosslyn Park
National 2
Promoted: London Scottish; West Hartlepool
Relegated: Liverpool-St Helens; Plymouth
National 3
Promoted: Fylde; Richmond
Relegated: Lydney (to 4 South); Nuneaton (to 4 North)
Headingley and Roundhay merged to form Leeds

National 4 North
Promoted: Aspatria
Relegated: Northern; Vale of Lune
Promoted into league: Rotherham; Stoke
National 4 South
Promoted: Havant
Relegated: Ealing; Sidcup
Promoted into league: Berry Hill; Thurrock

1992–93 season

National 1
Champions: Bath
Relegated: London Scottish; Rugby; Saracens; West Hartlepool
National 2
Promoted: Newcastle-Gosforth
Relegated: Bedford; Blackheath; Coventry; Fylde; Morley; Richmond; Rosslyn Park
National 3
Promoted: Otley
Relegated to National 4: Askeans; Aspatria; Broughton Park; Clifton; Leeds; Liverpool-St Helens; Plymouth; Sheffield

National 4 North
Promoted into National 4: Harrogate
Relegated: Towcestrians
Promoted into league: Birmingham-Solihull; Bradford & Bingley
National 4 South
Promoted: Sudbury
Relegated: Thurrock
Promoted into league: Reading; Tabard

Introduction of home and away fixtures

1993–94 season

The 1993–94 season saw the reduction in size of the national divisions to 10 teams and the creation of a new National 4 division. It also saw the introduction of home and away fixtures. National 4 (North and South) kept its same format but were now renamed to National 5 (North and South).

National 1

Champions: Bath
Relegated: London Irish; Newcastle-Gosforth
National 2
Promoted: Sale; West Hartlepool
Relegated: Otley; Rugby
National 3
Promoted: Coventry; Fylde
Relegated: Havant; Redruth
National 4
Promoted: Clifton; Harrogate
Relegated: Sheffield (to 5 North); Sudbury (to 5 South)

National 5 North
Promoted: Rotherham
Relegated: Bradford & Bingley; Durham City
Promoted into league: Barkers Butts; Wharfedale
National 5 South
Promoted: Reading
Relegated: Maidstone; Southend
Promoted into league: Barking; Henley

1994–95 season

National 1

Champions: Leicester
Relegated: Northampton
National 2
Promoted: Saracens
Relegated: Coventry; Fylde
National 3
Promoted: Bedford; Blackheath
Relegated: Clifton; Exeter
National 4
Promoted: Reading; Rotherham
Relegated: Askeans (to 5 South); Broughton Park (to 5 North)

National 5 North
Promoted: Walsall
Relegated: Barkers Butts; Hereford
Promoted into league: Sandal; Worcester
National 5 South
Promoted: London Welsh
Relegated: Basingstoke; Sudbury
Promoted into league: Camberley; Cheltenham

1995–96 season

National 1

Champions: Bath
National 2
Promoted: London Irish; Northampton
National 3
Promoted: Coventry; Richmond, Rotherham; Rugby
National 4
No promotion as merged into National 3
Relegated: Aspatria (to 4 North); Plymouth (to 4 South)

National 5 North
Promoted: Wharfedale
Relegated: Broughton Park
Promoted into league: Hereford; Manchester
National 5 South
Promoted: Lydney
Relegated: Camborne
Promoted into league: Charlton Park; Newbury

Advent of professionalism

1996–97 season

This year saw the expansion of the top two divisions to 12 teams and the temporary expansion of National 3 to sixteen clubs. It also saw National 5 (North and South) revert to being National 4 (North and South), expanded to 14 teams, and for the first time, with home and away fixtures. The leagues became openly professional this year.

National 1

Champions: Wasps
Relegated: Orrell; West Hartlepool
National 2
Promoted: Newcastle; Richmond
Relegated: Nottingham; Rugby
National 3
Promoted: Exeter; Fylde
Relegated: Clifton; Havant; Redruth (all three to 2 South); Walsall (to 2 North)

National 4 North
Promoted: Worcester
Relegated: Hereford; Stoke
Promoted into league: Hinckley; Sedgley Park
National 4 South
Promoted: Newbury
Relegated: Askeans; Berry Hill; Charlton Park; High Wycombe
Promoted into league: Bridgwater; Esher

Two premierships era

1997–98 season

The 1997–98 season saw the addition of sponsorship by Allied Dunbar and as a result a rebranding of National 1 and 2 to Premiership 1 and 2, whereas National 3 became the new National 1, while National 4 (North and South) became National 2 (North and South) accordingly.

Premiership 1

Champions: Newcastle Falcons
Relegated: Bristol
Premiership 2
Promoted: Bedford; London Scottish; West Hartlepool
National 1
Promoted: Leeds; London Welsh; Rugby; Worcester

National 2 North
Promoted: Birmingham-Solihull; Manchester
Promoted into league: New Brighton; Whitchurch
National 2 South
Promoted: Camberley; Henley
Promoted into league: Bracknell; Norwich

1998–99 season

The 1998–99 season saw the expansion of the two premiership divisions to fourteen teams.

Premiership 1

Champions: Leicester
Relegated: West Hartlepool
London Scottish and Richmond disband
Premiership 2
Promoted: Bristol
Relegated: Blackheath; Fylde
National 1
Promoted: Henley; Manchester
Relegated: Liverpool-St Helens; Morley (both to 2 North)

National 2 North
Promoted: Preston Grasshoppers
Relegated: Hinckley; Lichfield; Winnington Park
Promoted into league: Bedford Athletic; Doncaster
National 2 South
Promoted: Bracknell
Relegated: Havant
Promoted into league: Penzance & Newlyn; Westcombe Park

1999–2000 season

The 1999–2000 season saw the contraction of Premiership 1 to twelve teams with London Scottish and Richmond being absorbed into London Irish and reforming in county leagues.

Premiership 1

Champions: Leicester
Relegated: Bedford
Premiership 2
Promoted: Rotherham
Relegated: Rugby; West Hartlepool
National 1
Promoted: Birmingham-Solihull; Otley
Relegated: Blackheath; Reading (both to 3 South)

National 2 North
Promoted: Kendal
Relegated: Sheffield
Promoted into league: Dudley Kingswinford; Tynedale
National 2 South
Promoted: Esher
Relegated: Bridgwater & Albion; Metropolitan Police; Norwich
Promoted into league: Basingstoke; Launceston

One Premiership era

2000–01 season

The 2000–01 season saw Zurich take over the sponsorship of the top division with no interest in the second tier. This saw Premiership 2 rebranded National 1, with National 1 and 2 (North and South) becoming National 2 and 3 (North and South) respectively. It also saw the creation of a promotion play-off between the runners-up of the National 3 divisions with an extra relegation place from National 2. A new Championship competition for the top eight clubs was introduced this season. It was intended that the winners of the Championship would become champions  but this decision was revoked after outcry. This season also saw the introduction of the rugby union bonus points system.

Premiership
Champions: Leicester
Relegated: Rotherham
National 1
Promoted: Leeds
Relegated: Orrell; Waterloo
National 2
Promoted: Bracknell; Rugby
Relegated: Camberley; Lydney (both to 3 South); West Hartlepool (to 3 North)
National 3 North
Promoted: Sedgley Park; Stourbridge
Relegated: Aspatria; Walsall
Promoted into league: Blaydon; Darlington Mowden Park; Scunthorpe
National 3 South
Promoted: Plymouth
Relegated: Basingstoke; Cheltenham; Reading; Weston-super-Mare
Promoted into league: Cinderford; Old Colfeians; Old Patesians

2001–02 season

Premiership
Champions: Leicester
National 1
Champions (not promoted): Rotherham
Relegated: Bracknell; Henley
National 2
Promoted: Orrell; Plymouth
Relegated: Preston Grasshoppers; Waterloo (both to 3 North); Rosslyn Park (to 3 South)
National 3 North
Promoted: Doncaster
Relegated: Morley; Sandal; West Hartlepool; Whitchurch
Promoted into league: Broadstreet; Halifax; Hull Ionians
National 3 South
Promoted: Launceston; Penzance & Newlyn
Relegated: Cinderford; Clifton
Promoted into league: Basingstoke; Havant; Weston-super-Mare

2002–03 season

This season saw the replacement of the Zurich Championship with a top four play-off, the winner of which would be crowned champions.
Premiership
Champions: Wasps
Relegated: Bristol
National 1
Promoted: Rotherham
Relegated: Moseley; Rugby
National 2
Promoted: Henley; Penzance & Newlyn
Relegated: Fylde; Kendal (both to 3 North); Launceston (to 3 South)
National 3 North
Promoted: Nuneaton
Relegated: Bedford Athletic; Broadstreet; Hull Ionians; Scunthorpe
Promoted into league: Darlington; Longton; Macclesfield
National 3 South
Promoted: Lydney; Rosslyn Park
Relegated: Camberley; Havant
Promoted into league: Dings Crusaders; Haywards Heath; Southend

2003–04 season

Premiership
Champions: Wasps
Relegated: Rotherham
National 1
Promoted: Worcester
Relegated: Manchester
Wakefield disband
National 2
Promoted: Nottingham; Sedgley Park
Relegated: Lydney (to 3 South); Rugby (to 3 North)
National 3 North
Promoted: Waterloo
Relegated: Liverpool-St Helens; Longton; Preston Grasshoppers
Promoted into league: Bedford Athletic; Bradford & Bingley; Cleckheaton
National 3 South
Promoted: Blackheath; Launceston
Relegated: Basingstoke; Old Colfeians
Promoted into league: Havant; Hertford; Reading

2004–05 season

Premiership
Champions: Wasps
Relegated: Harlequins
National 1
Promoted: Bristol
Relegated: Henley; Orrell
National 2
Promoted: Doncaster; Newbury
Relegated: Bracknell; Rosslyn Park (both to 3 South); Nuneaton (to 3 North)
National 3 North
Promoted: Halifax
Relegated: Bedford Athletic; Dudley Kingswinford; Rugby
Promoted into league: Hull Ionians; Leicester Lions; Preston Grasshoppers
National 3 South
Promoted: Barking; Redruth
Relegated: Haywards Heath; Tabard; Weston-super-Mare
Promoted into league: Bridgwater & Albion; Cambridge; Cinderford

2005–06 season

The 2005–06 season saw Zurich replaced as Premiership sponsors by Guinness

Premiership
Champions: Sale
Relegated: Leeds
National 1
Promoted: Harlequins
National 2
Promoted: Moseley; Waterloo
Relegated: Orrell (to 3 North)
National 3 North
Promoted: Bradford & Bingley; Nuneaton
Relegated: Kendal; New Brighton
Promoted into league: Morley; Rugby; West Park St Helens
National 3 South
Promoted: Cambridge
Relegated: Bracknell; Reading
Promoted into league: Canterbury; Chinnor; Clifton

2006–07 season

The 2006–07 season saw National 1 expanded to sixteen clubs.

Premiership
Champions: Leicester
Relegated: Northampton
National 1
Promoted: Leeds
Relegated: Otley; Waterloo
National 2
Promoted: Esher; Launceston
Relegated: Barking (to 3 South); Bradford & Bingley; Harrogate (both to 3 North)
National 3 North
Promoted: Blaydon
Relegated: Darlington; Cleckheaton; Orrell
Promoted into league: Beverley; Caldy
National 3 South
Promoted: Southend; Westcombe Park
Relegated: Chinnor; Hertford; Old Patesians
Promoted into league: Ealing; London Scottish; Luton; Mounts Bay

2007–08 season

Premiership
Champions: Wasps
Relegated: Leeds
National 1
Promoted: Northampton
Relegated: Birmingham-Solihull; Launceston
National 2
Promoted: Manchester; Otley
Relegated: Halifax; Nuneaton (both to 3 North); Henley (to 3 South)
National 3 North
Promoted: Tynedale
Relegated: Beverley; Morley; West Park St Helens
Transferred to 3 South: Rugby
Promoted into league: Huddersfield; Kendal; Loughborough Students
National 3 South
Promoted: Cinderford; Mounts Bay
Relegated: Clifton; Luton; North Walsham
Promoted into league: Chinnor; Richmond; Worthing

2008–09 season

Premiership
Champions: Leicester
Relegated: Bristol
National 1
Promoted: Leeds
Relegated: Esher; Manchester; Newbury; Otley; Sedgley Park
National 2
Promoted: Birmingham-Solihull
Relegated: Southend; Westcombe Park (both to 2 South); Waterloo (to 2 North)
Mounts Bay disband
National 3 North
Promoted: Nuneaton
Relegated: Darlington Mowden Park
Halifax disband
Promoted into league: Broadstreet; Hull; Westoe
National 3 South
Promoted: London Scottish
Relegated: Chinnor; Havant
Transferred to 2 North: Rugby
Promoted into league: Barnes; Clifton; Shelford

Additional National 3 divisions
The 2009–10 season saw the creation of several National 3 divisions. The North and South divisions were replaced with North, Midlands, South West and London divisions.

National 3 North

Beverley
Birkenhead Park
Chester
Cleckheaton
Darlington Mowden Park
Middlesbrough
Morley
Penrith
Rochdale
Rossendale
Sheffield Tigers
Stockport
West Hartlepool
West Park St Helens

National 3 Midlands

Ampthill
Bedford Athletic
Bromsgrove
Hereford
Hinckley
Kenilworth
Kettering
Longton
Luctonians
Luton
Malvern
Newport (Salop)
Peterborough
South Leicester

National 3 South West

Barnstable
Bournemouth
Chinnor
Chippenham
Cleve
Coney Hill
Exmouth
Maidenhead
Old Patesians
Oxford Harlequins
Reading
Redingensians
Taunton
Weston-super-Mare

National 3 London

Basingstoke
Bishop's Stortford
Bracknell
Diss
Dorking
Havant
Haywards Heath
Hertford
Jersey
North Walsham
Old Albanians
Portsmouth
Sutton & Epsom
Tring

2009–10 season

The 2009–10 season saw major changes to the league system below the Premiership. The second tier was reduced to twelve teams and rebranded the RFU Championship with a play-off system and only one relegation spot. National 2 and 3 (North and South) reverted to National 1 and National 2 (North and South), and were expanded to sixteen teams. Four National 3 divisions were created based around the top regional leagues with fourteen teams in each (see above). National play-offs for the title were created for the winners of the National 2 and National 3 divisions. A similar play-off series was created for the eight winners of the regional divisions.

Premiership
Champions: Leicester
Relegated: Worcester
Championship
Promoted: Exeter
Relegated: Coventry
National 1
Promoted: Esher
Relegated: Manchester; Nuneaton (both to National 2 North); Newbury (to National 2 South)
National 2 North
Promoted: Macclesfield
Relegated: Broadstreet (to 3 Midlands); Bradford & Bingley; Waterloo (both to 3 North)
National 2 South
Promoted: Barking; Rosslyn Park
Relegated: Barnes (to 3 London); Bridgwater & Albion (to 3 South West)
National 3 North
Promoted: Morley
Relegated: Cleckheaton; West Hartlepool; West Park St Helens
Transferred to 3 Midlands: Sheffield Tigers
Promoted in: Billingham; Lymm; Sandal
National 3 Midlands
Promoted: Hinckley (to 2 South); Luctonians (to 2 North)
Relegated: Bedford Athletic; Kettering
Transferred to 3 London: Ampthill
Promoted in: Burton; Old Northamptonians; Scunthorpe
National 3 South West
Promoted: Taunton
Relegated: Chippenham; Maidenhead; Reading
Promoted in: Cheltenham; Hartpury College; Newton Abbot
National 3 London
Promoted: Jersey; Old Albanians
Relegated: Haywards Heath; Portsmouth; Sutton & Epsom
Promoted in: Civil Service; Gravesend; Staines

2010–11 season

Premiership
Champions: Saracens
Relegated: Leeds
Championship
Promoted: Worcester
Relegated: Birmingham-Solihull
National 1
Promoted: London Scottish
Relegated: Otley (to National 2 North); Launceston; Redruth (both to National 2 South)
National 2 North
Promoted: Fylde
Relegated: Manchester; Rugby Lions (both to 3 Midlands); Morley (to 3 North)
National 2 South
Promoted: Ealing Trailfinders; Jersey
Relegated: Canterbury (to 3 London); Hinckley (to 3 Midlands); Newbury (to 3 South West)
National 3 North
Promoted: Stockport
Relegated: Billingham; Middlesbrough; Rochdale
Promoted in: Altrincham Kersal; Burnage; West Hartlepool
National 3 Midlands
Promoted: Bromsgrove; Sheffield Tigers
Relegated: Burton; Kenilworth; Peterborough
Transferred to 3 London: Luton
Promoted in: Dudley Kingswinford; Mansfield; Syston
National 3 South West
Promoted: Hartpury College
Relegated: Cheltenham; Cleve; Coney Hill
Promoted in: Amersham & Chiltern; Chippenham; Old Redcliffians
National 3 London
Promoted: Barnes; Hertford
Relegated: Basingstoke; Diss; North Walsham
Promoted in: London Irish Amateurs; Tonbridge Juddian; Westcliff

2011–12 season

Premiership
Champions: Harlequins
Relegated: Newcastle Falcons

Championship
Promoted: London Welsh
Relegated: Esher

National 1
Promoted: Jersey
Relegated: Birmingham & Solihull; Stourbridge (both to National 2 North); Barking (to National 2 South)

National 2 North
Promoted: Loughborough Students
Relegated: Harrogate; Kendal (both to 3 North); Nuneaton (to 3 Midlands)

National 2 South
Promoted: Old Albanians; Richmond
Relegated: Barnes; Hertford; Westcombe Park (to 3 London)

National 3 North
Promoted: Darlington Mowden Park
Relegated: Beverley; Altrincham Kersal; Morley
Promoted in: Billingham; Percy Park

National 3 Midlands
Promoted: Dudley Kingswinford (to 2 North); Rugby Lions were due to be promoted to 2 South but were expelled before the season started 
Relegated: Hereford; Old Northamptonians; Manchester
Transferred to 3 South West: Malvern
Promoted in: Sutton Coldfield; Bournville; Derby; Sandbach

National 3 South West
Promoted: Bournemouth; Chinnor
Relegated: Old Redcliffians; Newbury Blues; Bridgwater & Albion
Promoted in: Maidenhead; Brixham; Avonmouth Old Boys

National 3 London
Promoted: Canterbury
Relegated: Bracknell; Luton; Havant
Transferred to 3 Midlands: Ampthill
Transferred to 3 South West: London Irish Amateurs
Promoted in: Thurrock; Guernsey; Old Elthamians

2012–13 season

 Premiership
 Champions: Leicester Tigers
 Relegated: London Welsh

 Championship
 Promoted: Newcastle Falcons
 Relegated: Doncaster Knights

 National 1
 Promoted: Ealing Trailfinders
 Relegated: Macclesfield; Sedgley Park (both to National 2 North); Cambridge (to National 2 South)

 National 2 North
 Promoted: Hull Ionians
 Relegated: Huddersfield; Stockport; Westoe (all to 2 North)

 National 2 South
 Promoted: Henley Hawks; Worthing
 Relegated: Barking (to 3 London); Lydney (to 3 South West)

 National 3 North
 Promoted: Chester; Harrogate
 Relegated: Birkenhead Park; Kendal; West Hartlepool
 Transferred to 3 Midlands: Lymm
 Promoted in: Beverley; Morley; Sale

 National 3 Midlands
 Promoted: Ampthill (to 2 South) 
 Relegated: Derby; Mansfield
 Promoted in: Bedford Athletic; Old Halesonians

 National 3 South West
 Promoted: Exmouth; London Irish Amateur
 Relegated:  Maidenhead; Malvern; Oxford Harlequins
 Promoted in: Bracknell; Old Centralians; Old Redcliffians; Worcester Wanderers

 National 3 London
 Promoted: Bishop's Stortford
 Relegated: Gravesend; Staines; Westcliff
 Promoted in: Basingstoke; Bury St Edmunds; East Grinstead

2013–14 season

 Premiership
 Champions: Northampton Saints
 Relegated: Worcester Warriors

 Championship
 Promoted: London Welsh
 Relegated: Ealing Trailfinders

 National 1
 Promoted: Doncaster Knights
 Relegated: Henley Hawks; Worthing Raiders (both to National 2 South); Hull Ionians (to National 2 North)

 National 2 North
 Promoted: Darlington Mowden Park; Macclesfield
 Relegated: Bromsgrove; Dudley Kingswinford (both to 3 Midlands); Sheffield Tigers (to 3 North)

 National 2 South
 Promoted: Hartpury College
 Relegated: Bournemouth; Exmouth (both to 3 South West); London Irish Amateur (to 3 London)
 Transferred to 2 North: Ampthill

 National 3 North
 Promoted: Huddersfield; Stockport
 Relegated: Bradford & Bingley; Penrith; Percy Park 
 Promoted in: Cleckheaton; Huddersfield YMCA; Wirral

 National 3 Midlands
 Promoted: Broadstreet 
 Relegated: Bedford Athletic; Newport; Syston
 Transferred to 3 North: Lymm 
 Promoted in: Burton; Lichfield; Peterborough Lions

 National 3 South West
 Promoted: Lydney 
 Relegated: Avonmouth Old Boys; Chippenham; Worcester Wanderers 
 Promoted in: Chard; Hornets; Oxford Harlequins 
 Transferred to 3 London: Amersham & Chiltern

 National 3 London
 Promoted: Dorking; Old Elthamians
 Relegated: Barking; Basingstoke; Thurrock 
 Promoted in: Chichester; Gravesend; Westcliff

2014–15 season

 Premiership
 Champions: Saracens
 Relegated: London Welsh

 Championship
 Promoted: Worcester Warriors
 Relegated: Plymouth Albion

 National 1
 Promoted: Ealing Trailfinders
 Relegated: Macclesfield; Tynedale (both to National 2 North); Old Albanians (to National 2 South)

 National 2 North
 Promoted: Ampthill; Hull Ionians
 Relegated: Birmingham & Solihull (to 3 Midlands); Hull; Stockport (to 3 North)

 National 2 South
 Promoted: Henley Hawks
 Relegated: Dings Crusaders; Lydney (both to 3 South West); Shelford (to 3 London)

 National 3 North
 Promoted: Sale Amateurs; Sandal
 Relegated: Beverley; Morley; Westoe 
 Promoted in: Birkenhead Park; Ilkley; Sheffield

 National 3 Midlands
 Promoted: South Leicester 
 Relegated: Bournville; Burton; Dudley Kingswinford
 Promoted in: Newport (Salop); Old Northamptonians; Syston

 National 3 South West
 Promoted: Redingensians 
 Relegated: Chard; Oxford Harlequins; Weston-super-Mare 
 Promoted in: Cleve; Chippenham; Ivybridge
 Transferred to 3 London: Bracknell

 National 3 London
 Promoted: Barnes; Bury St Edmunds
 Relegated: Amersham & Chiltern; CS Rugby 1863; Tring 
 Promoted in: Colchester; Eton Manor; Wimbledon

See also
English rugby union system
Premiership Rugby
RFU Championship
National League 1

References

Other sources
The Times newspaper 1984 onwards. News articles and results section.

External links
Moseley's history featuring many of the tables for the above leagues

 
Leagues